The Green Island Bridge crosses the Hudson River in New York, connecting Green Island with Troy, passing through Starbuck Island.  It opened September 12, 1981.

History
The original Rensselaer and Saratoga Railroad bridge was a wood-truss covered bridge built in 1832.  On May 10, 1862, it caught fire from the sparks of a passing locomotive and soon fell into the river. Parts of the burning structure, floating with the current, imperiled the steamboats and the smaller craft tied up along the wharves.  The devastating wind-driven fire also consumed more than 500 buildings covering  of downtown Troy.  This bridge was replaced by a second wooden bridge.

In 1884 a steel railroad bridge replaced the second wooden bridge. The steel bridge was really two parallel bridges owned by the Delaware and Hudson Railroad. When rail service ended in Troy on July 27, 1963, it was converted for automobile traffic. Until then the northern span was a rail bridge, and the southern span was a toll bridge for cars, trolleys, and pedestrians. It had a lift span added in 1924-25 for river shipping. The flood-induced scour undermined the lift span pier, causing the western lift tower and roadbed span of the bridge to collapse into the Hudson River.

The current Green Island Bridge (shown in the photos) was opened four-and-a-half years later on September 12, 1981.  Construction costs topped $23,000,000.   The bridge is a vertical lift bridge which is raised only occasionally for river traffic.  The two metal-covered frames, which straddle the roadway, house the counterweights and lift mechanisms. The lift bridge joins Troy and Center Island (once known as Starbuck Island), an island in the river.  There is another bridge that connects Center Island with the village of Green Island (which is no longer an island).

See also
List of fixed crossings of the Hudson River
List of reference routes in New York

References

External links

 Historic Photos of Green Island Bridge   (scan down page to "Hudson River Bridge" section)
Green Island Bridge at Capital Highways

Vertical lift bridges in New York (state)
Bridges over the Hudson River
Bridges completed in 1832
Covered bridges in New York (state)
Bridges completed in 1884
Bridges completed in 1981
Bridges in Rensselaer County, New York
Wooden bridges in New York (state)
Road bridges in New York (state)
Former toll bridges in New York (state)
Girder bridges in the United States